Treider College (formerly  Otto Treiders Handelsskole 'Otto Treider Business School' and Treider Privatskole 'Treider Private School') is a nationwide professional school in Norway with programs in areas such as tourism, administration (for administrative secretaries, legal secretaries, and half-year courses for secretaries), and sales management (sales and services). The school was founded by the Free Church proponent Otto Treider in 1882 at Kristian Augusts gate 21, and in its time it was Norway's largest and leading business school, offering courses in accounting, economics, and marketing. Treider College has premises at Nedre Vollgate 8 in Oslo and regional offices in Bergen and Trondheim.

The company Treider Fagskoler AS, which operates the school, is owned by the investment company Anthon B Nilsen AS, one of Scandinavia's largest private companies involved in education.

References

External links
 Treider College website

Educational institutions established in 1882
Schools in Oslo
1882 establishments in Norway